Flight 321 may refer to:

QuebecAir Flight 321,  hijacked on 14 December 1972
EgyptAir Flight 321, hijacked on 23 August 1976
Asian Spirit Flight 321, accident on January 2, 2008

0321